José Joaquín Herrera (1784-1868) was a Venezuelan military and politician, president of Carabobo from 1846 to 1854, and in 1855 he was appointed provisional president of Venezuela from 20 January 1855 until 30 January 1855 in the succession of power between José Gregorio Monagas and his brother José Tadeo Monagas. He served as the vice president of Venezuela from 1851 until 1855.

Biography
José Joaquín Herrera was born in 1784 in the city of Valencia. From a "humble" family, in his youth he enlisted in the militia fighting for independence. He was involved in the military between April 1810 and July 1811.

After Venezuela separated from Colombia, he participated in the local government of the state of Carabobo, serving as state governor from 1846 until 1854. In 1849, he was involved in the capture of José Antonio Páez in the uprising against José Tadeo Monagas. In January 1855, he temporarily held the position of president, while elections were held. Liberal in his political leanings, Herrera died in Caracas in 1868, at the age of 84.

See also
Vice President of Venezuela
List of presidents of Venezuela 
List of Ministers of Foreign Affairs of Venezuela

References

External links

 

 

 

1784 births
1868 deaths
Vice presidents of Venezuela
Venezuelan Ministers of Foreign Affairs